The Tamron SP 70-200mm F/2.8 Di VC USD is an interchangeable telezoom lens with constant, large aperture. It is available in Nikon, Canon and Sony mounts and was announced by Tamron on September 13, 2012.

References
http://www.dpreview.com/products/tamron/lenses/tamron_70-200_2p8_vc/specifications

70-200
Camera lenses introduced in 2012